Mea Fisher aka DJ Mea, born Amy Elizabeth Fisher, is an American electronic music DJ, vocalist, and producer known for singing live vocals over her DJ sets. She gained prominence as the lead singer for the industrial rock band Lords of Acid touring and recording an album with the band.

Musical career 
Fisher rose to international fame in 2000, working in the Chicago house scene, collaborating with producers. she performed on the Funky Tekno Tribe Tour as its only female DJ. Her first DJ mix compilation was released in 2000, under the label After Hours.

In 2008, she formed an industrial band called MeandMyMachine. She later fulfilled her role as the lead singer for electro-industrial rock band Lords of Acid, joining them on their 2011 Sonic Angel tour and Extreme Fest Tour in 2017, and providing lead vocals on their 2012 album, Deep Chills.

Shortly after the band's first tour with her as the front woman, she did a live performance at Coachella 2012 as herself, billed as “Mea” with her own live band, opening the festival both weekends where she played The Sahara Tent at the Coachella Festival,

Her first musical project for film was her part of a movie score that led to a soundtrack single to the major motion picture, “Freelancers” starring Robert Deniro, Forest Whitaker & 50 Cent released by Lionsgate Films.

She has also worked as a music producer for video games and film such as Psylab and Kung Fu Factory, having created music for games available on Xbox and PlayStation.

Discography

Lords of Acid 

 Deep Chills - 2012

Personal life 
Mea was born and raised in Kansas City, she currently resides in Los Angeles

References

External links
 
 

Women DJs
American women singers
Living people
People from Kansas City, Missouri
Year of birth missing (living people)